Artur Manuel Ribeiro Soares Dias (born 14 July 1979) is a Portuguese football referee who is a listed international referee for FIFA and UEFA since 2010.

After having accompanied his countryman Olegário Benquerença in several UEFA Champions League as additional assistant referee, Soares Dias refereed matches at 2012–13 UEFA Europa League. Furthermore, he was appointed by the European football governing body to take charge of the Under-21 Championship play-off match between Italy and Sweden.

He was in the U20 World Cup in New Zealand in 2015 and refereed the quarter final USA vs Serbia. He was also in Serbia in U17 Euro and refereeing the semi final in 2011.

On 5 January 2017, while Soares Dias was getting ready to do his training in Maia, two days before officiating the Primeira Liga match between Paços de Ferreira and FC Porto, he and his family received death threats by individuals whom he identified as being part of Super Dragões, an official supporters group of FC Porto. He reported the incident to the police against "unknown individuals".

See also
List of football referees

References

External links 
 
 
 
 

1979 births
Living people
Sportspeople from Vila Nova de Gaia
Portuguese football referees
UEFA Europa League referees
2018 FIFA World Cup referees
UEFA Euro 2020 referees